The Football Club de Grenoble Rugby (FCG) is a French rugby union club based in Grenoble and founded in 1892.

FCG was champion of France in 1954 and runner-up in 1918 and in 1993 during a controversial final, being deprived of the title of champion of France following a refereeing error.

The club also won the Challenge Yves du Manoir in 1987 and was finalist in 1969, 1986 and 1990.

FC Grenoble played in the Top 14, the top level of the French league system, for the 2019–2020 season, but were relegated to Pro D2 at the season end.
Grenoble have played home matches at the Stade des Alpes (capacity 20,068) since 2014–2015. The club's colors are red and blue.
The FCG is currently chaired by Nicolas Cuynat.
The first team is supervised by several specialists: Fabien Gengenbacher as head coach, Nicolas Nadau senior coach, Arnaud Héguy forwards coach and Jean-Noël Perrin scrum coach.

History
The club was founded in 1892 following the merger of the main clubs in Grenoble in Rhône-Alpes.

Runners-up French Championship 1918
After becoming champions of the Alps in 1912, FCG reached the final of the Coupe de l'Espérance in 1918, which replaced the old championship of France during the First World War.
Since then Grenoble have regularly featured in the finals.
Grenoble contributed notable players to the original French National Team, among them Edmond Besset and Felix Lasserre and Edmond Vellat.
In 1931, Grenoble was one of 14 clubs who left the French Rugby Federation to create their own organization, UFRA.

French Champion 1954
In 1954, the first team, then coached by Roger Bouvarel, wrote the most beautiful page in the history of the club.
The team was nicknamed by the press the foreign Legion.
FC Grenoble won his first Bouclier de Brennus and became champion of France after a 5–3 victory against the U.S. Cognac.
Champions in 1954 :

Runners-up European Championship 1963
With Jean Liénard became coach, Grenoble played the final of the European Champion Clubs' Cup FIRA in 1963.

Runners-up of the Challenge Yves du Manoir 1969
In 1969, Grenoble bows in the final of the Challenge Yves du Manoir against the US Dax on the score of 24–12.

Runners-up of the Challenge Yves du Manoir 1986
In 1986, Grenoble bows in the final of the Challenge Yves du Manoir against the AS Montferrand on the score of 22–15.

Winner of the Challenge Yves du Manoir 1987
In 1987, Grenoble won the Challenge Yves du Manoir against the SU Agen on the score of 26–7.
This is the second major trophy for the club.
The winners of the Challenge Yves du Manoir in 1987 :

Runners-up of the Challenge Yves du Manoir 1990
In 1990, Grenoble bows in the final of the Challenge Yves du Manoir against the RC Narbonne on the score of 24–19.

A second French championship Title denied following a refereeing error 1993
The arrival of Jacques Fouroux in control of the team for the 1992-93 season associated with Michel Ringeval marks the beginning of a new era called the Mammoths of Grenoble.
Despite overpowering pack Grenoble tilts on the score of 14–11.
A try of Olivier Brouzet is denied to Grenoble and the decisive try by Gary Whetton was awarded by the referee, Daniel Salles, when in fact the defender Franck Hueber from Grenoble touched down the ball first in his try zone.
This error gave the title to Castres. Salles admitted the error 13 years later
.
.
Fouroux conflict with the Federation and who was already suspicious before the match of the referee cry out conspiracy.
Players Championship controversial Final in 1993 :

Since then the club has struggled.

First participation in the Heineken Cup 2000
FC Grenoble play the 1999–2000 Heineken Cup in Pool 6.
FCG is the only team to beat Nothampton the future winner of the event.

Results

Descent and come back in the elite

They were relegated to the French second division and came back again.
At the end of 2004–05, they were relegated to the French second division, Rugby Pro D2, after the top level was reduced from sixteen to fourteen teams. However, they were relegated even further, to the amateur Fédérale 1, due to financial problems; an audit of the club's books revealed debts of €3.64 million as of 30 June
2005. They
earned promotion back to the professional ranks at the first opportunity, and played in Pro D2, in 2006–07; they finished their first season back in ProD2 in fourteenth place (out of sixteen), surviving the drop by one point over Limoges.
They ended the 2007–08 season in eighth, close to the play-offs.
In 2010–11 Grenoble finished second, losing the play-off semi-final game at home against Union Bordeaux Bègles.
In 2011–12 Grenoble finished first, securing their return to the Top 14 for the 2012–13 season.
In their first season back in the top flight, they were in contention for a playoff place early in the season, but faded to 11th, still safely above the relegation zone.
After the 2016–17 season, Grenoble have been relegated to the Pro D2 and in the 2017–18 season, ProD2 runners-up Grenoble have been promoted to the Top14, after a 47–22 victory over Oyonnax.
The promotion/relegation play-off win sees Grenoble head back to the French top flight, having dropped down this time last season.

Honours
Among the club's honours are the championship of the Top 14 and of the Challenge Yves du Manoir.
Its achievements include:
 Top 14
 Champions (1) : 1954
 Runners-up (1) : 1918 (Coupe de l'Espérance), 1993
 French second division:
 Champions (2) : 1951, 2012
 Runners-up (2) : 2002, 2018
 Challenge Yves du Manoir:
 Champions (1) : 1987
 Runners-up (3) : 1969, 1986, 1990
Challenge Jean Bouin:
 Runners-up (2) : 1992, 1994
Access Match:
 Champions (1) : 2018
 Runners-up (1) : 2019
 French Championship Reserves:
 Champions (5) : 1950, 1952, 1953, 1960, 1980 (Nationale B)
 Runners-up (2) : 1969, 1972
 Cup Frantz-Reichel:
 Champions (4) : 1981, 1992, 2013, 2014
 Runners-up (3) : 1989, 1990, 1993
 Cup René Crabos:
 Champions (2) : 1995, 2018
 Runners-up (2) : 1990, 1996
 Challenge complete club:
 Champions (1) : 1993
 European Champion Clubs' Cup FIRA:
 Runners-up (1) : 1963
 Legion Rugby Challenge:
 Champions (1) : 2014

Finals results

French premiership

Challenge Yves du Manoir

Current standings

Current squad

The squad for the 2022–23 season is:

Notes:

Espoirs squad

Staff

Notable former players

  Diego Albanese
  Ezequiel Jurado
  José Orengo
  Federico Todeschini
  Joaquín Tuculet
  Bautista Ezcurra
  Felipe Ezcurra
  Sam Cordingley
  Peter Kimlin
  Dan Palmer
  Junior Rasolea
  John Welborn
  Kenan Mutapcic
  Jamie Cudmore
  Shane O'Leary
  Stephen Setephano
  Olly Barkley
  Aly Muldowney
  James Percival
  Jone Daunivucu
  Aloisio Butonidualevu
  Alipate Ratini
  Sisa Waqa
  Viliame Waqaseduadua
  Ropate Rinakama
  Benito Masilevu
  Timoci Nagusa
  David Aucagne
  Fabien Barcella
  Gilbert Brunat
  Didier Camberabero
  William Demotte
  Thierry Devergie
  Lucas Dupont
  Fabrice Estebanez
  Julien Frier
  Gaëtan Germain
  Arnaud Héguy
  Nicolas Laharrague
  Legi Matiu
  Ludovic Mercier
  Geoffroy Messina
  Willy Taofifénua
  Benjamin Thiéry
  Jonathan Wisniewski
  Mahamadou Diaby
  Etienne Fourcade
  Gervais Cordin
  Ali Oz
  Nathanaël Hulleu
  Adrien Séguret
  Jean-Charles Orioli
  Levan Ghvaberidze
  Paliko Jimsheladze
  Vasil Katsadze
  Beka Gigashvili
  Davit Kubriashvili
  Luka Goginava
  Zurab Zhvania
  Daniel Browne
  Andrew Farley
  James Hart
  Chris Farrell
  Sergio Lanfranchi
  Franco Piccinini
  Ange Capuozzo
  Aaron Bancroft
  John Blaikie
  Robbie Deans
  Nigel Hunt
  Tone Kopelani
  Mark Mayerhofler
  Blair Stewart
  Jackson Willison
  Grzegorz Kacala
  Petru Balan
  Florin Corodeanu
  Romeo Gontineac
  Petre Mitu
  Gheorghe Solomie
  Ovidiu Tonita
  Gio Aplon
  Rudi Coetzee
  Wylie Human
  Theo Jansen van Rensburg
  Charl McLeod
  Hendrik Roodt
  Shaun Sowerby
  Deon Fourie
  Raymond Rhule
  Peter Steven
  Tony Stanger
  David Mélé
  Inoke Afeaki
  William Helu
  Suka Hufanga
  Leva Fifita
  Tanginoa Halaifonua
  Toma'akino Taufa
  Atu Manu
  Stuart Evans

French international that the club has provided

Tee
Cyril Savy is the first player to use a tee in France in 1993.
In the semi-finals at the last minute of the game when the FCG faces SU Agen, Savy succeeds a penalty a goal of 60m and gets an overtime.
His club came out victorious before being deprived of a title of champion of France on a refereeing error in a controversial final against Castres Olympique.

See also
 List of rugby union clubs in France
 Rugby union in France

References

External links
  FC Grenoble Official website

 
Grenoble
Rugby clubs established in 1892
Sport in Grenoble